Ruggell is a municipality of Liechtenstein. It is the northernmost and lowest elevated municipality. As of 2019, it has a population of 2,322.

History
The name is said to be from the Latin for "clearing the land" (roncale - ad roncalem). Most known for conservation areas and the historic St. Fridolin's Parish Church.

Geography
While Liechtenstein is known as a largely mountainous country, Ruggell is largely flat and is situated along the Rhine River, where the international borders with Switzerland and Austria meet. 

Flora and fauna 

On the north side of the Eschnerberg mountain is located the roughly 90-hectare nature reserve Ruggeller Riet, rich in fauna and especially in flora. The great biodiversity of the Ruggeller Riets includes peat moss, moor  grass, Kleinseggenrieder and bogrush. At the end of May to June, the siberian iris blooms in the large parts of the nature reserve. 736 plant and 1,631 animal species occur in the Ruggeller Riet, among them the white stork and the Eurasian curlew, which has disappeared as a breeding bird since 1997.

The Ruggeller are popularly called "Lättaknätter". The loamy soil that occurs here is called "Lätta". In the past peat was used to heat houses during cold season. This ancient tradition has increasingly disappeared in recent years.

Sport
Municipality is famous for FC Ruggell, one of the best teams in the country, although it plays in the sixth division of Switzerland. In other sporting areas cycling, field hockey, skiing, and other winter sports stand out. In addition, the town of Ruggell has one of the four sports halls of Liechtenstein; the others are in Schaan, Vaduz, and Balzers.

Notable people 
 Klaus Tschütscher (born 1967) a politician from Liechtenstein, twelfth Prime Minister of Liechtenstein 2009–2013, lives in Ruggell. 
 Marcel Tschopp (born 1974 in Ruggell) a Liechtensteiner orienteer and track athlete, specializing in the marathon; was Liechtenstein's flag bearer for the opening ceremony of the 2008 Summer Olympics
 Benjamin Büchel (born 1989 in Ruggell) international footballer who plays for FC Vaduz.

References

External links

 

Municipalities of Liechtenstein
Liechtenstein–Switzerland border crossings
Austria–Liechtenstein border crossings